Black Bodies is a Canadian short film, directed by Kelly Fyffe-Marshall, produced by Tamar Bird and Sasha Leigh Henry and released in 2020. Inspired by a real-life incident when Fyffe-Marshall, Komi Olaf and Donisha Prendergast were travelling in California, and a woman in the neighbourhood called the police on them because she wrongly believed they were burglarizing their Airbnb rental, the film features Olaf and Prendergast performing spoken word pieces about the trauma of being victimized by anti-Black racism.

The film premiered at the 2020 Toronto International Film Festival, where Fyffe-Marshall was named the winner of the inaugural Changemaker Award.

The film was named to TIFF's year-end Canada's Top Ten list for short films. Fyffe-Marshall was subsequently awarded the Jay Scott Prize by the Toronto Film Critics Association.

The film won the Canadian Screen Award for Best Live Action Short Drama at the 9th Canadian Screen Awards.

The film has been released to digital platforms as a bonus feature accompanying Charles Officer's feature film Akilla's Escape.

Cast 

 Komi Olaf
 Donisha Rita Claire Prendergast

References

External links

2020s English-language films
2020 short films
Canadian drama short films
Films directed by Kelly Fyffe-Marshall
Films about racism
Best Live Action Short Drama Genie and Canadian Screen Award winners
2020s Canadian films